Scripps Heights is a rugged heights which are largely ice-covered, surmounting the peninsula between Casey Glacier and Lurabee Glacier on the east coast of Palmer Land, Antarctica. Deeply scarred by glaciers, the heights terminate on the east in Cape Walcott. Discovered by Sir Hubert Wilkins in his pioneer flight on December 20, 1928. Thinking the feature to be a large island lying between two great transverse channels which completely severed Antarctic Peninsula, he named it Scripps Island for William Scripps of Detroit, Michigan. Correlation of aerial photographs taken by Lincoln Ellsworth in 1935 and preliminary reports of the findings of the British Graham Land Expedition (BGLE) under Rymill, 1934–37, led W.L.G. Joerg to interpret this to be a peninsula. In published reports, members of the BGLE have concurred in this interpretation which was also borne out by the results of subsequent flights and a sledge trip from East Base by members of the United States Antarctic Service (USAS) in 1940.

See also
Hogmanay Pass

References

Mountains of Palmer Land